Dalli may refer to:

Places
 Dallı, Aşkale
 Dalli Rajhara, a city and a municipality, Durg district, Chhattisgarh State, India
 Dalli, Tanout, a former town in Tanout District, Zinder Region, Niger

Other uses
 Dalli (surname)

See also
 Dali (disambiguation)
 DALI (disambiguation)